Sayany is a rural locality (a selo) in Okinsky District, Republic of Buryatia, Russia. The population was 408 as of 2010. There are 7 streets.

Geography 
Sayany is located 28 km north of Orlik (the district's administrative centre) by road. Khara-Khuzhir is the nearest rural locality.

References 

Rural localities in Okinsky District